Operation Panzerfaust was a military operation undertaken in October 1944 by the German  to ensure the Kingdom of Hungary would remain a German ally in World War II. When German dictator Adolf Hitler received word that Hungary's Regent, Admiral Miklós Horthy, was secretly negotiating his country's surrender to the advancing Red Army, he sent commando leader Otto Skorzeny of the Waffen-SS and former special forces commander Adrian von Fölkersam to Hungary. Hitler feared that Hungary's surrender would expose his southern flank, where Romania had just joined with the Soviets and cut off a million German troops still fighting the Soviet advance in the Balkans. The operation was preceded by Operation Margarethe in March 1944, which was the occupation of Hungary by German forces, which Hitler had hoped would secure Hungary's place in the Axis powers. This had also enabled the deportation of the majority of Hungarian Jews, previously beyond the reach of the Nazis, through uneasy cooperation with Hungarian authorities. This policy was, however, terminated as Soviet forces drew closer and the USAAF, based in Italy, began bombing Hungary, including Budapest.

Prelude
Having anticipated Horthy's move, Skorzeny had been instructed to remove Horthy from power. Horthy's son Miklós Horthy Jr. was meeting with Soviet representatives. Miklós Jr. was informed by the German Security Service through intermediaries that envoys of Marshal Tito of Yugoslavia wanted to meet with him. Miklós Jr. had failed to keep a prior meeting when he observed suspicious individuals near the proposed meeting place. A second meeting was set for early 15 October at the offices of Felix Bornemisza, the Director of the Hungarian Danube ports. He hoped that the Yugoslavian representatives might have important news, but upon entering the building, Skorzeny and his troops attacked and beat him into submission. They then kidnapped Miklós at gunpoint, trussed him up in a carpet, immediately drove him to the airport and flew him to Vienna. From there, he was transported to Mauthausen concentration camp.

Horthy's declaration of armistice
Working through his trustworthy General Béla Miklós, who was in contact with Soviet forces in eastern Hungary, Horthy attempted to negotiate the end of the war, seeking to surrender to the Soviets while preserving the government's autonomy.  Although Horthy was an intractable anti-Communist, his dealings with the Nazis led him to conclude the Soviets were the lesser evil. The Soviets willingly promised that Hungary would remain autonomous and sovereign.

Horthy governed from Castle Hill in central Budapest, an ancient and now well-guarded fortress. He blamed the German government for "forcing" Hungary into war, and during a meeting of the Crown Council declared that:

At 2:00 p.m. on 15 October 1944, Horthy announced in a national radio broadcast that Hungary had signed an armistice with the Soviets. However, the Germans had been aware of Horthy's behind-the-scenes manoeuvring and had already set in motion plans to replace his government with forces loyal to the German cause, effectively occupying Hungary. With Nazi help, the Arrow Cross Party seized the radio station shortly after Horthy signed off. A party member wrote a counter-proclamation and used the name of the Hungarian Army's Chief of the General Staff, General Vörös. The commanding officer and his assistant of the two remaining Hungarian army units in Budapest were arrested or disappeared, and their soldiers fell in line with the Arrow-Cross party.

 Skorzeny then brazenly led a convoy of German troops and four Tiger II tanks to the Vienna Gates of Castle Hill. Horthy recognized that he had no means to fight the German armor and superior forces. He issued orders that "no resistance should be made." One unit did not get these orders, and fought the Germans for about 30 minutes.

Capture of Horthy 
Horthy was taken into custody by Edmund Veesenmayer and his staff later on 15 October. Kept overnight in the Waffen SS offices, he returned to the Palace to collect his personal belongings. There he was confronted with a demand to sign a typewritten statement handed to him by Premier Géza Lakatos. The statement announced that Horthy was renouncing the armistice and abdicating in favour of Arrow Cross leader Ferenc Szálasi. Surprised that his loyal friend would encourage him to sign the document, Horthy was told by Lakatos that his son's life was at stake. When Horthy asked Veesenmayer if this was true, Veesenmayer confirmed the threat. The regent understood that this was an effort to put the stamp of his prestige on a Nazi-sponsored Arrow Cross coup, but signed anyway.

Horthy later explained his capitulation: "I neither resigned nor appointed Szálasi Premier, I merely exchanged my signature for my son’s life. A signature wrung from a man at machine-gun point can have little legality."

Despite Veesenmayer's solemn promise to obtain Horthy's son's release from the German concentration camp, Miklós Jr. remained a prisoner until the war's end on 8 May 1945. Horthy himself was transported to the Schloss Hirschberg near Weilheim, Germany, and guarded by 100 Waffen SS men at all times. On 1 May 1945, Lt. Gen. Alexander Patch, the commander of the US 7th Army, visited Horthy in his castle prison. Because Hungary had fought on to the end defending Germany, Horthy was considered a prisoner of war. Seven months later, on 17 December 1945, he was released from the Nuremberg penitentiary and was reunited with his family in a private home in Weilheim.

See also
 Operation Margarethe

References

Panzerfaust
Panzerfaust
Panzerfaust
1940s coups d'état and coup attempts
Germany–Hungary relations